Omicidio all'italiana (Homicide Italian-style) is a 2017 Italian comedy film directed by Maccio Capatonda.

Plot 
In the small village of Acitrullo the inhabitants live a simple and monotonous life. Mayor Piero Peluria does not know how to change the monotony, but has a brilliant idea when the old Countess Ugalda Martiro In Cazzati dies, choked by the dinner. The mayor, with the complicity of his brother Marino, makes the TV believe that it is a homicide, so that the village comes out of anonymity and becomes famous throughout Italy.

Cast

References

External links 

2017 comedy films
Films set in Pescara
Films shot in Pescara
Italian comedy films
2010s Italian films
2010s Italian-language films